Kyō Noguchi  (June 14, 1939January 1, 2009) was a Japanese former professional boxer who was best known for winning the Japanese flyweight title and fighting for the Oriental and Pacific Boxing Federation title.

Professional career

On April 28, 1961, Kyō Noguchi defeated Atsuto Fukumoto to win the Japanese flyweight championship and won the title by a decision. This made history as  the first parent and son boxing champion in Japan because Susumu Noguchi was the Japanese welterweight champion. On May 30, 1962, Noguchi challenged Pone Kingpetch for the flyweight world championship, Noguchi lost by unanimous decision.

On January 1, 2009, Kyō Noguchi died of heart failure at his home in Adachi, Tokyo.

Personal life

Osamu Noguchi the founder of Kickboxing was  Kyō Noguchi's brother.

Professional boxing record

References

External links

Noguchi Gym

1939 births
2009 deaths
People from Ehime Prefecture
Flyweight boxers
Japanese male boxers
Boxing promoters